Chrysophyllum gonocarpum is a tree in the family Sapotaceae, native to South America.

Description
The brown to pink wood is used commercially.

Distribution and habitat
Chrysophyllum gonocarpum is native to Argentina, Bolivia, Brazil, Paraguay and Uruguay. Its habitat is in lowland or foothill forests.

References

gonocarpum
Flora of Northeast Argentina
Flora of Bolivia
Flora of Brazil
Flora of Paraguay
Flora of Uruguay
Plants described in 1863